Arthur N. Daniels (Oct. 31, 1860 - Jan. 1, 1903) was the first House speaker of the Oklahoma Territorial Legislature and a member of the Oklahoma People's Party.

An Illinois native, Daniels arrived in Oklahoma Territory and took part in the Land Run of 1889. He was elected to the First Territorial Legislature of 1890 and chosen by fellow lawmakers to serve as the speaker of the Territorial House of Representatives. As a leader of a coalition of Populists, Democrats, and renegade Republicans, Daniels helped locate what would become Oklahoma State University in Stillwater.

Early life
Daniels was born in Illinois and graduated from Knox College in 1880. He arrived in Oklahoma Territory in 1889, the year of the land run. He owned a homestead in what at the time was Canadian County, but today is Kingfisher County.

Political career
Daniels was able to secure votes for his election to the First Territorial Legislature by promising to make Frisco, Oklahoma the county seat of Canadian County. He joined the Territorial House of Representatives in 1890 and was elected the youngest speaker of the house in the nation. He represented District 4, along with two other legislators.

Daniels was a member of The People's Party, which rose during the Territorial era. Many Populist legislators were simple farmers and Daniels seldom wore socks. There were only four Populists legislators out of 39  in 1890, but they led through a coalition of Populists, Democrats, and renegade Republicans. Daniels and the coalition were responsible for the location of what would become Oklahoma State University in Stillwater.

After his term he continued to be active as a lobbyist until his death in Guthrie in 1903.

References

People from Illinois
People from Kingfisher County, Oklahoma
Members of the Oklahoma Territorial Legislature
19th-century American politicians
Knox College (Illinois) alumni
1860 births
1903 deaths
Oklahoma Populists